Dixville is a township in Greater Monrovia District, Montserrado County, Liberia. The Dixville township was one of five townships founded in the second wave of colonization, between 1828 and 1847 (when Liberia was declared an independent state).

Government 
In 2018 President George Weah appointed Comfort W. Taylor as Commissioner for Dixville.

Dixville is part of the Montserrado-11 electoral district.

Demographics 
Dixville township is divided into two communities;

References

City corporations, townships and borough of the Greater Monrovia District